Sarin Darreh may refer to:
 Sarin Darreh, Khodabandeh
 Sarin Darreh, Mahneshan